Zeynep Çelik is a Turkish born architect, architectural historian, theorist, and academic. She is a distinguished professor of architecture at the New Jersey Institute of Technology. Her work focuses on the nineteenth and twentieth century urban history, colonialism, orientalism and modernity.

Biography
She graduated from Robert College in 1970 and obtained her B.Arch from Istanbul Technical University Faculty of Architecture in 1975. She received her master's degree from Rice University and her doctorate from the University of California in 1978 and 1985 respectively. Çelik started teaching at the Faculty of Architecture and Design of the New Jersey Institute of Technology in 1991. She is a member of the Turkish Academy of Sciences, a distinguished professor of architecture at the New Jersey Institute of Technology, and the Sakip Sabanci professor of history at Columbia University.

Works
 The Remaking of Istanbul: Portrait of an Ottoman City
 Displaying the Orient
 Urban Forms and Colonial Confrontations
 At the End of the Century: One Hundred Years of Architecture with Richard Koshalek
 Empire, Architecture, and the City: French-Ottoman Encounters
 About Antiquities: Politics of Archaeology in the Ottoman Empire
 Europe Knows Nothing about the Orient: A Critical Discourse

References

20th-century Turkish architects
Robert College alumni
Istanbul Technical University alumni
Rice University alumni
Members of the Turkish Academy of Sciences
New Jersey Institute of Technology faculty
University of California alumni
Columbia University faculty
Year of birth missing (living people)
Living people
20th-century Turkish women scientists